Michael A. Allowitz (born 1964) is an American television director and producer. He is well known for his work on The CWs The Vampire Diaries and The Originals.

Career
He was an assistant director on films such as The Prom (1992), Saints and Sinner, Slums of Beverly Hills, Cruel Intentions, and Bring It On Again. He was first assistant director on TV series such as The Comeback, In Treatment. He directed 11 episodes of The Vampire Diaries such as "Christmas Through Your Eyes". He also served as director on The Originals, Containment, Freakish and The Flash. From 2017 – 2021 he has directed 11 episodes of Dynasty.

References

External links
 

American television directors
1964 births
Living people
Date of birth missing (living people)
Place of birth missing (living people)